Lallie is an unincorporated community in Benson County, North Dakota, United States. In 1885, it was originally named Fort Totten by the Northern Pacific Railroad, before becoming Totten in 1887 and then Lallie in 1889, taking the sister of Superintendent A.J. McCabe as its namesake.

References

Unincorporated communities in North Dakota
Unincorporated communities in Benson County, North Dakota